"Dreamboy/Dreamgirl" is a single released by Cynthia and Johnny O. This duet was the most successful song on the Billboard Hot 100 released by either artist, peaking at No. 53 in 1990.

Charts

References

1990 songs
1990 singles
Cynthia (singer) songs
Johnny O songs
Song articles with missing songwriters